The 1948 Harvard Crimson football team was an American football team that represented Harvard University during the 1948 college football season.  In its 1st season under head coach Arthur Valpey, the team compiled a 4–4 record and were outscored by a total of 184 to 130.

Harvard played its home games at Harvard Stadium in the Allston neighborhood of Boston, Massachusetts.

Schedule

References

Harvard
Harvard Crimson football seasons
Harvard Crimson football
1940s in Boston